Two Is One is an album by American saxophonist Charles Rouse recorded in 1974 and released on the Strata-East label.

Reception
The Allmusic review by Brandon Burke awarded the album 4 stars and stated "Given his discography, this record is atypical and probably not for everyone, but enjoyable nonetheless".

Track listing
 "Bitchin'" (George Davis) - 7:19		
 "Hopscotch" (Joe Chambers) - 7:18		
 "In a Funky Way" (Davis) - 4:52		
 "Two Is One" (Charles Rouse, Roland Hanna) - 11:16		
 "In His Presence Searching" (David Lee) - 9:29

Personnel
Charles Rouse - tenor saxophone, bass clarinet
George Davis (tracks 1, 3 & 5), Paul Metzke - guitar
Calo Scott - cello
Martin Rivera (tracks 1 & 3), Stanley Clarke (tracks 2, 4 & 5) - bass
David Lee - drums
Azzedin Weston - congas (tracks 1 & 3)
Airto Moreira - percussion (tracks 2, 4 & 5)

References

Strata-East Records albums
Charlie Rouse albums
1974 albums